R Aquilae is a variable star in the equatorial constellation of Aquila. It is located approximately 780 light years distant from the Sun based on parallax, and is drifting further away with a radial velocity of 35 km/s. This is a thermally-pulsating Mira variable that ranges in brightness from 5.3 down to 12.0 with a period of 269.84 days. The period was over 300 days when first observed, and has declined steadily since – decreasing from 320 in 1915 down to 264 in 2010, at an average rate of 0.4 days per year. The amplitude of the variation has also decreased by about a magnitude since discovery. The peak magnitude is bright enough for the star to be visible to the naked eye as a dim, red-hued star.

R Aquilae is an aging red giant on the asymptotic giant branch with a stellar classification that varies over time, between M5e and M9e, where the 'e' suffix indicates emission features in the spectrum. The cooler spectral types occur near the minimum visual magnitude, and the hottest near maximum. The star may have recently undergone a helium flash. It is oxygen-rich in abundance with the same mass as the Sun but has expanded to 259 times the Sun's radius. On average, the star is radiating 3,470 K times the luminosity of the Sun from its swollen photosphere at an effective temperature of 3000 K or so.

References

M-type giants
Mira variables
Emission-line stars

Aquila (constellation)
Durchmusterung objects
177940
093820
7243
Aquilae, R